Streptomyces nanshensis is a bacterium species from the genus of Streptomyces which has been isolated from marine sediments from the South China Sea near the Nansha Islands in China.

See also 
 List of Streptomyces species

References

Further reading

External links
Type strain of Streptomyces nanshensis at BacDive -  the Bacterial Diversity Metadatabase

nanshensis
Bacteria described in 2009